The Galway & District League is an association football league organized by the Galway Football Association. It features amateur and junior clubs from County Galway. It currently features eight divisions. Its top division, the Premier Division, is a seventh level division in the Republic of Ireland football league system. Galway & District League teams also compete the FAI Junior Cup. It is currently sponsored by Western Hygiene Supplies, a company based in Tuam

History
From newspapers viewed at the National Library of Ireland, the first Galway League may have been played for in 1925–26. It was won by Galway Celtic Albion F.C. with the runners up being Galway Celtic F.C. There is no formal relegation system with any other league within the Republic of Ireland football league system. However both Mervue United and Salthill Devon played in the inaugural 2008 A Championship season. They were both subsequently promoted to the League of Ireland First Division. In 2014 they both withdrew to make way for a single Galway team – Galway United. The senior teams of Mervue United and Salthill Devon subsequently rejoined the Galway & District League.

Premier Division Clubs

Past winners

References

 
7
Association football leagues in Connacht